Antoine Wright may refer to:

 Antoine Wright (politician) (born 1960), Vanuatuan politician
 Antoine Wright (basketball) (born 1984), American basketball player